Bruce Alan Cozart (born October 3, 1955) is an American politician and businessman who has been a Republican member of the Arkansas House of Representatives since 2011.

Early life and education
Cozart was born on October 3, 1955. Cozart graduated from Lake Hamilton High School in 1973.

Early career
Cozart founded Bruce Cozart Construction, Inc. in 1977. He is a general contractor for commercial and residential buildings. Cozart served on the Lake Hamilton school board from 1991 to 2001.

Political career

2011 election
Cozart won a special election against Jerry Raphon on March 8, 2011.

2011-12 Legislature
During the 2011-12 Legislature Cozart served on the following committees:
 Aging, Children and Youth, Legislative and Military Affairs
 Public Transportation

2012 election
Cozart won re-election 7,778 votes to 4,624 against Jimmie Harmon.

2013-14 Legislature
During the 2013-14 Legislature Cozart served on the following committees:
 Joint Energy
 Education
 City, County and Local Affairs

2014 election
Cozart ran unopposed in the 2014 election.

2015-16 Legislature
During the 2015-16 Legislature Cozart served on the following committees:
 Education, Chairman
 Insurance and Commerce
 Legislative Joint Auditing

2016 election
Cozart ran unopposed in the 2016 election.

2017-18 Legislature
During the 2017-18 Legislature Cozart served on the Following committees:
Agriculture, Forestry and Economic Development
Education, Chairman

2018 election
Cozart won re-election 6,460 votes to Kallen Peret's 2,913.

2019-20 Legislature
During the 2019-20 Legislature Cozart served on the Following committees:
Academic Facilities Oversight Committee, Co-Chairman
Legislative Council
House Education Committee
House State Agencies and Governmental Affairs Committee

In February 2019, Cozart sponsored a bill that would raise minimum teacher salaries across the state of Arkansas.
The bill was passed by the Arkansas House of Representatives. There were funding concerns about the bill before it passed.

2020 election
Cozart ran unopposed in the 2020 election.

2021-22 Legislature
During the 2021-22 Legislature Cozart serves on the Following committees:
House Education Committee, Chairman
House State Agencies and Governmental Affairs Committee
Joint Performance Review Committee
Legislative Council

In February 2021, Cozart sponsored a bill that would allow parents to challenge curriculum they did not like.
It came less than a day after a failure of a bill that banned the 1619 Project from being used in schools. The bill passed and became law.
Cozart, alongside Missy Irvin in the Arkansas Senate, helped get another teacher pay increase bill passed in both the Arkansas House and Senate in April 2021. The bill would aim to increase median teacher salaries across the board.
Governor Asa Hutchinson signed the bills on April 12, 2021.

Personal life
Cozart is married and has two sons. Cozart is a follower of the Assembly of God faith.

References

1955 births
20th-century American businesspeople
21st-century American businesspeople
21st-century American politicians
American construction businesspeople
Assemblies of God people
Businesspeople from Arkansas
Living people
People from Garland County, Arkansas
Republican Party members of the Arkansas House of Representatives
School board members in Arkansas